The Granger Select 200 was a NASCAR Busch Grand National Series race held at the Louisville Motor Speedway in Louisville, Kentucky. First run in 1988, it was last run as part of the 1989 season.

Past winners

References

External links 
 

Former NASCAR races
NASCAR Xfinity Series races
NASCAR races at Louisville Motor Speedway
1988 establishments in Kentucky
1989 disestablishments in Kentucky